Professor Vedat Buz (born 1966 in Elazığ), is a Turkish jurist. He is professor of civil law of Ankara University, Law School and Bilkent University Faculty of Law, and author of three law books: Kamu İhale Sözleşmelerinin Kuruluşu ve Geçerlilik Şartları (Establishment and Terms of Validity of Public Procurement Contracts), Medeni Hukukta Yenilik Doğuran Haklar and Borçlunun Temerrüdünde Sözleşmeden Dönme. He is an expert on law of obligations.

He is married and has two children.

References
GBooks
Ankara University
http://www.llrx.com/authors/1109  LLRX

1966 births
Living people
Turkish jurists
Academic staff of Ankara University
Academic staff of Bilkent University
People from Elazığ